Jay Miller is an American anthropologist who is known for his wide-ranging fieldwork with and scholarship about different Native American groups, especially the Delaware (Lenape), Tsimshian, and Lushootseed Salish.  He is himself of Lenape ancestry.

He grew up in upstate New York, where he was given a Mohawk (Iroquois) name.

As an undergraduate, he was influenced by the anthropologist Florence Hawley Ellis.

He received his Ph.D. from Rutgers University, for a dissertation on the Keresan Pueblo people.  While in New Jersey, he began working with speakers of the Delaware language. In this context he was adopted and named in the Delaware Wolf clan, his clan mother being Nora Thompson Dean, with whom he collaborated on a publication on the Delaware "Big House" rite.

Friendship with the anthropologist Viola Garfield while living in Seattle led to fieldwork among the Tsimshian at Hartley Bay, British Columbia, where Miller was adopted into the Gispwudwada (Killerwhale clan).

He was formerly Associate Director of the D'Arcy McNickle Center for American Indian History at the Newberry Library in Chicago.

He has also done fieldwork with the Salish people at the Colville Indian Reservation in Washington state and received names among the Creek and Tewa tribes.

Bibliography

 Miller, Jay (1984) "Feasting with the Southern Tsimshian." In: The Tsimshian: Images of the Past: Views for the Present, ed. by Margaret Seguin, pp. 27–39. Vancouver: University of British Columbia Press
 Miller, Jay (1988) Shamanic Odyssey: A Comparative Study of the Lushootseed (Puget Salish) Journey to the Land of the Dead in Terms of Death, Power, and Cooperating Shamans in Native North America.  Menlo Park, Calif.: Ballena Press.
 Miller, Jay (ed.) (1990) Mourning Dove: A Salishan Autobiography.  Lincoln: University of Nebraska Press.
 Miller, Jay (1997) Tsimshian Culture: A Light through the Ages.  Lincoln: University of Nebraska Press.
 Miller, Jay (1999) Lushootseed Culture and the Shamanic Odyssey.  Lincoln: University of Nebraska Press.
 Miller, Jay (2001) "Naming as Humanizing."  In: Strangers to Relatives: The Adoption and Naming of Anthropologists in Native North America, ed. by Sergei Kan, pp. 141–158.  Lincoln: University of Nebraska Press.
 Miller, Jay, and Nora Dean (1978) "A Personal Account of the Delaware Big House Rite." Pennsylvania Archaeologist, vol. 48, nos. 1-2, pp. 39–43.

Living people
American anthropologists
Year of birth missing (living people)